Johann Wolfgang von Goethe (28 August 1749 – 22 March 1832) was a German poet, playwright, novelist, scientist, statesman, theatre director, and critic. His works include plays, poetry, literature, and aesthetic criticism, as well as treatises on botany, anatomy, and colour. He is widely regarded as the greatest and most influential writer in the German language, his work having a profound and wide-ranging influence on Western literary, political, and philosophical thought from the late 18th century to the present day.

Goethe took up residence in Weimar in November 1775 following the success of his first novel, The Sorrows of Young Werther (1774). He was ennobled by the Duke of Saxe-Weimar, Karl August, in 1782. Goethe was an early participant in the Sturm und Drang literary movement. During his first ten years in Weimar, Goethe became a member of the Duke's privy council (1776–1785), sat on the war and highway commissions, oversaw the reopening of silver mines in nearby Ilmenau, and implemented a series of administrative reforms at the University of Jena. He also contributed to the planning of Weimar's botanical park and the rebuilding of its Ducal Palace.

Goethe's first major scientific work, the Metamorphosis of Plants, was published after he returned from a 1788 tour of Italy. In 1791 he was made managing director of the theatre at Weimar, and in 1794 he began a friendship with the dramatist, historian, and philosopher Friedrich Schiller, whose plays he premiered until Schiller's death in 1805. During this period Goethe published his second novel, Wilhelm Meister's Apprenticeship; the verse epic Hermann and Dorothea, and, in 1808, the first part of his most celebrated drama, Faust. His conversations and various shared undertakings throughout the 1790s with Schiller, Johann Gottlieb Fichte, Johann Gottfried Herder, Alexander von Humboldt, Wilhelm von Humboldt, and August and Friedrich Schlegel have come to be collectively termed Weimar Classicism.

The German philosopher Arthur Schopenhauer named Wilhelm Meister's Apprenticeship one of the four greatest novels ever written, while the American philosopher and essayist Ralph Waldo Emerson selected Goethe as one of six "representative men" in his work of the same name (along with Plato, Emanuel Swedenborg, Montaigne, Napoleon, and Shakespeare). Goethe's comments and observations form the basis of several biographical works, notably Johann Peter Eckermann's Conversations with Goethe (1836). His poems were set to music by many composers including Mozart, Beethoven, Schubert, Berlioz, Liszt, Wagner, and Mahler.

Life

Early life 
Goethe's father, Johann Caspar Goethe, lived with his family in a large house (today the Goethe House) in Frankfurt, then a free imperial city of the Holy Roman Empire. Though he had studied law in Leipzig and had been appointed Imperial Councillor, Johann Caspar Goethe was not involved in the city's official affairs. Johann Caspar married Goethe's mother, Catharina Elisabeth Textor, in Frankfurt on 20 August 1748, when he was 38 and she was 17. All their children, with the exception of Johann Wolfgang and his sister Cornelia Friederica Christiana (born in 1750), died at early ages.

His father and private tutors gave the young Goethe lessons in common subjects of their time, especially languages (Latin, Greek, Biblical Hebrew (briefly), French, Italian, and English). Goethe also received lessons in dancing, riding, and fencing. Johann Caspar, feeling frustrated in his own ambitions, was determined that his children should have all those advantages that he had not.

Although Goethe's great passion was drawing, he quickly became interested in literature; Friedrich Gottlieb Klopstock (1724–1803) and Homer were among his early favorites. He had a devotion to theater as well, and was greatly fascinated by puppet shows that were annually arranged in his home; this became a recurrent theme in his literary work Wilhelm Meister's Apprenticeship.

He also took great pleasure in reading works on history and religion. He writes about this period:

Goethe also became acquainted with Frankfurt actors. In early literary attempts he showed an infatuation with Gretchen, who would later reappear in his Faust, and the adventures with whom he would concisely describe in Dichtung und Wahrheit. He adored Caritas Meixner (1750–1773), a wealthy Worms trader's daughter and friend of his sister, who would later marry the merchant G. F. Schuler.

Legal career 

Goethe studied law at Leipzig University from 1765 to 1768. He detested learning age-old judicial rules by heart, preferring instead to attend the lessons of the poet and university's professor Christian Fürchtegott Gellert. In Leipzig, Goethe fell in love with craftsman and innkeeper's daughter Anna Katharina Schönkopf and wrote cheerful verses about her in the Rococo genre. In 1770, he anonymously released Annette, his first collection of poems. His uncritical admiration for many contemporary poets vanished as he became interested in Gotthold Ephraim Lessing and Christoph Martin Wieland. By this time, Goethe had already written a great deal, but he discarded nearly all of these works except for the comedy Die Mitschuldigen. The restaurant Auerbachs Keller and its legend of Johann Georg Faust's 1525 barrel ride impressed him so much that Auerbachs Keller became the only real place in his closet drama Faust Part One. As his studies did not progress, Goethe was forced to return to Frankfurt at the close of August 1768.

Goethe became severely ill in Frankfurt. During the year and a half that followed, because of several relapses, the relationship with his father worsened. During convalescence, Goethe was nursed by his mother and sister. In April 1770, Goethe left Frankfurt in order to finish his studies at the University of Strasbourg.

In Alsace, Goethe blossomed. No other landscape has he described as affectionately as the warm, wide Rhine area. In Strasbourg, Goethe met Johann Gottfried Herder. The two became close friends, and crucially to Goethe's intellectual development, Herder kindled his interest in William Shakespeare, Ossian and in the notion of Volkspoesie (folk poetry). On 14 October 1772 Goethe held a gathering in his parental home in honour of the first German "Shakespeare Day". His first acquaintance with Shakespeare's works is described as his personal awakening in literature.

On a trip to the village Sessenheim, Goethe fell in love with Friederike Brion, in October 1770, but terminated the relationship in August 1771. Several of his poems, like "", "" and "", originate from this time.

At the end of August 1771, Goethe acquired the academic degree of the Licentiate of Law from Strasbourg and established a small legal practice in Frankfurt. Although in his academic work he had expressed the ambition to make jurisprudence progressively more humane, his inexperience led him to proceed too vigorously in his first cases, and he was reprimanded and lost further ones. This prematurely terminated his career as a lawyer after only a few months. At this time, Goethe was acquainted with the court of Darmstadt, where his inventiveness was praised. From this milieu came Johann Georg Schlosser (who later became Goethe's brother-in-law) and Johann Heinrich Merck. Goethe also pursued literary plans again; this time, his father did not have anything against it, and even helped. Goethe obtained a copy of the biography of a noble highwayman from the German Peasants' War. In a couple of weeks the biography was reworked into a colourful drama. Entitled Götz von Berlichingen, the work went directly to the heart of Goethe's contemporaries.

Goethe could not subsist on being one of the editors of a literary periodical (published by Schlosser and Merck). In May 1772 he once more began the practice of law at Wetzlar. In 1774 he wrote the book which would bring him worldwide fame, The Sorrows of Young Werther. The outer shape of the work's plot is widely taken over from what Goethe experienced during his Wetzlar time with Charlotte Buff (1753–1828) and her fiancé, Johann Christian Kestner (1741–1800), as well as from the suicide of the author's friend Karl Wilhelm Jerusalem (1747–1772); in it, Goethe made a desperate passion of what was in reality a hearty and relaxed friendship. Despite the immense success of Werther, it did not bring Goethe much financial gain because copyright laws at the time were essentially nonexistent. (In later years Goethe would bypass this problem by periodically authorizing "new, revised" editions of his Complete Works.)

Early years in Weimar 

In 1775, Goethe was invited, on the strength of his fame as the author of The Sorrows of Young Werther, to the court of Karl August, Duke of Saxe-Weimar-Eisenach, who would become Grand Duke in 1815. (Karl August at the time was 18 years of age, to Goethe's 26.) Goethe thus went to live in Weimar, where he remained for the rest of his life and where, over the course of many years, he held a succession of offices, including superintendent of the ducal library, and was the Duke's friend and chief adviser.

In 1776, Goethe formed a close relationship with Charlotte von Stein, an older, married woman. The intimate bond with her lasted for ten years, after which Goethe abruptly left for Italy without giving his companion any notice. She was emotionally distraught at the time, but they were eventually reconciled.

Goethe, aside from official duties, was also a friend and confidant to Duke Karl August and participated in the activities of the court. For Goethe, his first ten years at Weimar could well be described as a garnering of a degree and range of experiences which perhaps could have been achieved in no other way. In 1779, Goethe took on the War Commission of the Grand Duchy of Saxe-Weimar, in addition to the Mines and Highways commissions. In 1782, when the chancellor of the Duchy's Exchequer left his office, Goethe agreed to act in his place and did so for two and a half years; this post virtually made him prime minister and the principal representative of the Duchy. Goethe was ennobled in 1782 (this being indicated by the "von" in his name). In that same year, Goethe moved into what would be his primary residence in Weimar for the next 50 years.

As head of the Saxe-Weimar War Commission, Goethe participated in the recruitment of mercenaries into the Prussian and British military during the American Revolution. The author  claims that Goethe engaged in negotiating the forced sale of vagabonds, criminals, and political dissidents as part of these activities.

Italy 

Goethe's journey to the Italian peninsula and Sicily from 1786 to 1788 was of great significance in his aesthetic and philosophical development. His father had made a similar journey, and his example was a major motivating factor for Goethe to make the trip. More importantly, however, the work of Johann Joachim Winckelmann had provoked a general renewed interest in the classical art of ancient Greece and Rome. Thus Goethe's journey had something of the nature of a pilgrimage to it. During the course of his trip Goethe met and befriended the artists Angelica Kauffman and Johann Heinrich Wilhelm Tischbein, as well as encountering such notable characters as Lady Hamilton and Alessandro Cagliostro.

He also journeyed to Sicily during this time, and wrote that "To have seen Italy without having seen Sicily is to not have seen Italy at all, for Sicily is the clue to everything." While in Southern Italy and Sicily, Goethe encountered, for the first time genuine Greek (as opposed to Roman) architecture, and was quite startled by its relative simplicity. Winckelmann had not recognized the distinctness of the two styles.

Goethe's diaries of this period form the basis of the non-fiction Italian Journey. Italian Journey only covers the first year of Goethe's visit. The remaining year is largely undocumented, aside from the fact that he spent much of it in Venice. This "gap in the record" has been the source of much speculation over the years.

In the decades which immediately followed its publication in 1816, Italian Journey inspired countless German youths to follow Goethe's example. This is pictured, somewhat satirically, in George Eliot's Middlemarch.

Weimar 

In late 1792, Goethe took part in the Battle of Valmy against revolutionary France, assisting Duke Karl August of Saxe-Weimar-Eisenach during the failed invasion of France. Again during the Siege of Mainz, he assisted Carl August as a military observer. His written account of these events can be found within his Complete Works.

In 1794, Friedrich Schiller wrote to Goethe offering friendship; they had previously had only a mutually wary relationship ever since first becoming acquainted in 1788. This collaborative friendship lasted until Schiller's death in 1805.

In 1806, Goethe was living in Weimar with his mistress Christiane Vulpius, the sister of Christian A. Vulpius, and their son August von Goethe. On 13 October, Napoleon's army invaded the town. The French "spoon guards", the least disciplined soldiers, occupied Goethe's house: 

They had already had several children together by this time, including their son, Julius August Walter von Goethe (1789–1830), whose wife, Ottilie von Pogwisch (1796–1872), cared for the elder Goethe until his death in 1832. Christiane von Goethe died in 1816. Johann reflected, "There is nothing more charming to see than a mother with her child in her arms, and there is nothing more venerable than a mother among a number of her children."

Later life 
After 1793, Goethe devoted his endeavours primarily to literature. By 1820, Goethe was on amiable terms with Kaspar Maria von Sternberg.

In 1821, having recovered from a near fatal heart illness, the 72-year-old Goethe fell in love with Ulrike von Levetzow, 17 at the time. In 1823, he wanted to marry her, but because of the opposition of her mother, he never proposed. Their last meeting in Carlsbad on 5 September 1823 inspired his poem "Marienbad Elegy" which he considered one of his finest works. During that time he also developed a deep emotional bond with the Polish pianist Maria Szymanowska, 33 at the time and separated from her husband.

In 1821 Goethe's friend Carl Friedrich Zelter introduced him to the 12-year-old Felix Mendelssohn. Goethe, now in his seventies, was greatly impressed by the child, leading to perhaps the earliest confirmed comparison with Mozart in the following conversation between Goethe and Zelter:

Mendelssohn was invited to meet Goethe on several later occasions, and set a number of Goethe's poems to music. His other compositions inspired by Goethe include the overture Calm Sea and Prosperous Voyage (Op. 27, 1828), and the cantata Die erste Walpurgisnacht (The First Walpurgis Night, Op. 60, 1832).

Death 

In 1832, Goethe died in Weimar of apparent heart failure. His last words, according to his doctor , were,  (More light!), but this is disputed as Vogel was not in the room at the moment Goethe died. He is buried in the Ducal Vault at Weimar's Historical Cemetery.

Eckermann closes his famous work, Conversations with Goethe, with this passage:

The first production of Richard Wagner's opera Lohengrin took place in Weimar in 1850. The conductor was Franz Liszt, who chose the date 28 August in honour of Goethe, who was born on 28 August 1749.

Descendants
Goethe married his long-time lover Christiane Vulpius in 1806. They had 5 children, of whom only their eldest son August von Goethe managed to survive into adulthood. One was stillborn, while the others died early. August had 3 children with Ottilie von Goethe: Walther von Goethe, Wolfgang and Alma. Alma died of Typhoid fever during the outbreak in Vienna, the month before her 17th birthday. Walther and Wolfgang neither married nor had any children. Walther's gravestone states: "With him ends Goethe's dynasty, the name will last forever.", marking the end of Goethe's personal bloodline. While he has no direct descendants, his siblings have.

Literary work

Overview 
The most important of Goethe's works produced before he went to Weimar were Götz von Berlichingen (1773), a tragedy that was the first work to bring him recognition, and the novel The Sorrows of Young Werther (1774), which gained him enormous fame as a writer in the Sturm und Drang period which marked the early phase of Romanticism. Indeed, Werther is often considered to be the "spark" which ignited the movement, and can arguably be called the world's first "best-seller". During the years at Weimar before he met Schiller in 1794, he began Wilhelm Meister's Apprenticeship and wrote the dramas Iphigenie auf Tauris (Iphigenia in Tauris), Egmont, and Torquato Tasso and the fable Reineke Fuchs.

To the period of his friendship with Schiller belong the conception of Wilhelm Meister's Journeyman Years (the continuation of Wilhelm Meister's Apprenticeship), the idyll of Hermann and Dorothea, the Roman Elegies and the verse drama The Natural Daughter. In the last period, between Schiller's death, in 1805, and his own, appeared Faust Part One (1808), Elective Affinities (1809), the West-Eastern Diwan (an 1819 collection of poems in the Persian style, influenced by the work of Hafez), his autobiographical Aus meinem Leben: Dichtung und Wahrheit (From My Life: Poetry and Truth, published between 1811 and 1833) which covers his early life and ends with his departure for Weimar, his Italian Journey (1816–17), and a series of treatises on art. Faust, Part Two was completed before his 1832 death and published posthumously later that year. His writings were immediately influential in literary and artistic circles.

Goethe was fascinated by Kalidasa's Abhijñānaśākuntalam, which was one of the first works of Sanskrit literature that became known in Europe, after being translated from English to German.

Details of selected works 
The short epistolary novel Die Leiden des jungen Werthers, or The Sorrows of Young Werther, published in 1774, recounts an unhappy romantic infatuation that ends in suicide. Goethe admitted that he "shot his hero to save himself": a reference to Goethe's own near-suicidal  with a young woman during this period, an obsession he quelled through the writing process. The novel remains in print in dozens of languages and its influence is undeniable; its central hero, an obsessive figure driven to despair and destruction by his unrequited love for the young Lotte, has become a pervasive literary archetype. The fact that Werther ends with the protagonist's suicide and funeral—a funeral which "no clergyman attended"—made the book deeply controversial upon its (anonymous) publication, for on the face of it, it appeared to condone and glorify suicide. Suicide is considered sinful by Christian doctrine: suicides were denied Christian burial with the bodies often mistreated and dishonoured in various ways; in corollary, the deceased's property and possessions were often confiscated by the Church. However, Goethe explained his use of Werther in his autobiography. He said he "turned reality into poetry but his friends thought poetry should be turned into reality and the poem imitated". He was against this reading of poetry. Epistolary novels were common during this time, letter-writing being a primary mode of communication. What set Goethe's book apart from other such novels was its expression of unbridled longing for a joy beyond possibility, its sense of defiant rebellion against authority, and of principal importance, its total subjectivity: qualities that trailblazed the Romantic movement.

The next work, his epic closet drama Faust, was completed in stages. The first part was published in 1808 and created a sensation. Goethe finished Faust Part Two in the year of his death, and the work was published posthumously. Goethe's original draft of a Faust play, which probably dates from 1773–74, and is now known as the Urfaust, was also published after his death.

The first operatic version of Goethe's Faust, by Louis Spohr, appeared in 1814. The work subsequently inspired operas and oratorios by Schumann, Berlioz, Gounod, Boito, Busoni and Schnittke, as well as symphonic works by Liszt, Wagner and Mahler. Faust became the ur-myth of many figures in the 19th century. Later, a facet of its plot, i.e., of selling one's soul to the devil for power over the physical world, took on increasing literary importance and became a view of the victory of technology and of industrialism, along with its dubious human expenses. In 1919, the world premiere complete production of Faust was staged at the Goetheanum.

Goethe's poetic work served as a model for an entire movement in German poetry termed Innerlichkeit ("introversion") and represented by, for example, Heine. Goethe's words inspired a number of compositions by, among others, Mozart, Beethoven (who idolised Goethe), Schubert, Berlioz and Wolf. Perhaps the single most influential piece is "Mignon's Song" which opens with one of the most famous lines in German poetry, an allusion to Italy: "?" ("Do you know the land where the lemon trees bloom?").

He is also widely quoted. Epigrams such as "Against criticism a man can neither protest nor defend himself; he must act in spite of it, and then it will gradually yield to him", "Divide and rule, a sound motto; unite and lead, a better one", and "Enjoy when you can, and endure when you must", are still in usage or are often paraphrased. Lines from Faust, such as "", "", or "" have entered everyday German usage.

Some well-known quotations are often incorrectly attributed to Goethe. These include Hippocrates' "Art is long, life is short", which is echoed in Goethe's Faust and Wilhelm Meister's Apprenticeship.

Scientific work 

Although his literary work has attracted the most interest, Goethe was also keenly involved in studies of natural science. He wrote several works on morphology and colour theory. In the 1790s, he undertook Galvanic experiments and studied anatomical issues together with Alexander von Humboldt. He also had the largest private collection of minerals in all of Europe. By the time of his death, in order to gain a comprehensive view in geology, he had collected 17,800 rock samples.

His focus on morphology and what was later called homology influenced 19th-century naturalists, although his ideas of transformation were about the continuous metamorphosis of living things and did not relate to contemporary ideas of "transformisme" or transmutation of species. Homology, or as Étienne Geoffroy Saint-Hilaire called it "analogie", was used by Charles Darwin as strong evidence of common descent and of laws of variation. Goethe's studies (notably with an elephant's skull lent to him by Samuel Thomas von Soemmerring) led him to independently discover the human intermaxillary bone, also known as "Goethe's bone", in 1784, which Broussonet (1779) and Vicq d'Azyr (1780) had (using different methods) identified several years earlier. While not the only one in his time to question the prevailing view that this bone did not exist in humans, Goethe, who believed ancient anatomists had known about this bone, was the first to prove its existence in all mammals. The elephant's skull that led Goethe to this discovery, and was subsequently named the Goethe Elephant, still exists and is displayed in the Ottoneum in Kassel, Germany.

During his Italian journey, Goethe formulated a theory of plant metamorphosis in which the archetypal form of the plant is to be found in the leaf – he writes, "from top to bottom a plant is all leaf, united so inseparably with the future bud that one cannot be imagined without the other". In 1790, he published his Metamorphosis of Plants. As one of the many precursors in the history of evolutionary thought, Goethe wrote in Story of My Botanical Studies (1831):

Goethe's botanical theories were partly based on his gardening in Weimar.

Goethe also popularized the Goethe barometer using a principle established by Torricelli. According to Hegel, "Goethe has occupied himself a good deal with meteorology; barometer readings interested him particularly... What he says is important: the main thing is that he gives a comparative table of barometric readings during the whole month of December 1822, at Weimar, Jena, London, Boston, Vienna, Töpel... He claims to deduce from it that the barometric level varies in the same proportion not only in each zone but that it has the same variation, too, at different altitudes above sea-level".

In 1810, Goethe published his Theory of Colours, which he considered his most important work. In it, he contentiously characterized colour as arising from the dynamic interplay of light and darkness through the mediation of a turbid medium. In 1816, Schopenhauer went on to develop his own theory in On Vision and Colours based on the observations supplied in Goethe's book. After being translated into English by Charles Eastlake in 1840, his theory became widely adopted by the art world, most notably J. M. W. Turner. Goethe's work also inspired the philosopher Ludwig Wittgenstein, to write his Remarks on Colour. Goethe was vehemently opposed to Newton's analytic treatment of colour, engaging instead in compiling a comprehensive rational description of a wide variety of colour phenomena. Although the accuracy of Goethe's observations does not admit a great deal of criticism, his aesthetic approach did not lend itself to the demands of analytic and mathematical analysis used ubiquitously in modern Science. Goethe was, however, the first to systematically study the physiological effects of colour, and his observations on the effect of opposed colours led him to a symmetric arrangement of his colour wheel, "for the colours diametrically opposed to each other ... are those which reciprocally evoke each other in the eye." In this, he anticipated Ewald Hering's opponent colour theory (1872).

Goethe outlines his method in the essay The experiment as mediator between subject and object (1772). In the Kurschner edition of Goethe's works, the science editor, Rudolf Steiner, presents Goethe's approach to science as phenomenological. Steiner elaborated on that in the books The Theory of Knowledge Implicit in Goethe's World-Conception and Goethe's World View, in which he characterizes intuition as the instrument by which one grasps Goethe's biological archetype—The Typus.

Novalis, himself a geologist and mining engineer, expressed the opinion that Goethe was the first physicist of his time and "epoch-making in the history of physics", writing that Goethe's studies of light, of the metamorphosis of plants and of insects were indications and proofs "that the perfect educational lecture belongs in the artist's sphere of work"; and that Goethe would be surpassed "but only in the way in which the ancients can be surpassed, in inner content and force, in variety and depth—as an artist actually not, or only very little, for his rightness and intensity are perhaps already more exemplary than it would seem".

Eroticism 
Many of Goethe's works, especially Faust, the Roman Elegies, and the Venetian Epigrams, depict erotic passions and acts. For instance, in Faust, the first use of Faust's power after signing a contract with the Devil is to seduce a teenage girl. Some of the Venetian Epigrams were held back from publication due to their sexual content. Goethe clearly saw human sexuality as a topic worthy of poetic and artistic depiction, an idea that was uncommon in a time when the private nature of sexuality was rigorously normative.

In a conversation on 7 April 1830 Goethe stated that pederasty is an "aberration" that easily leads to "animal, roughly material" behavior. He continued, "Pederasty is as old as humanity itself, and one can therefore say, that it resides in nature, even if it proceeds against nature....What culture has won from nature will not be surrendered or given up at any price." On another occasion he wrote: "I like boys a lot, but the girls are even nicer. If I tire of her as a girl, she'll play the boy for me as well".

Religion and politics 
Goethe was a freethinker who believed that one could be inwardly Christian without following any of the Christian churches, many of whose central teachings he firmly opposed, sharply distinguishing between Christ and the tenets of Christian theology, and criticizing its history as a "hodgepodge of mistakes and violence". His own descriptions of his relationship to the Christian faith and even to the Church varied widely and have been interpreted even more widely, so that while Goethe's secretary Eckermann portrayed him as enthusiastic about Christianity, Jesus, Martin Luther, and the Protestant Reformation, even calling Christianity the "ultimate religion", on one occasion Goethe described himself as "not anti-Christian, nor un-Christian, but most decidedly non-Christian," and in his Venetian Epigram 66, Goethe listed the symbol of the cross among the four things that he most disliked. According to Nietzsche, Goethe had "a kind of almost joyous and trusting fatalism" that has "faith that only in the totality everything redeems itself and appears good and justified."

Born into a Lutheran family, Goethe's early faith was shaken by news of such events as the 1755 Lisbon earthquake and the Seven Years' War. A year before his death, in a letter to Sulpiz Boisserée, Goethe wrote that he had the feeling that all his life he had been aspiring to qualify as one of the Hypsistarians, an ancient sect of the Black Sea region who, in his understanding, sought to reverence, as being close to the Godhead, what came to their knowledge of the best and most perfect. Goethe's unorthodox religious beliefs led him to be called "the great heathen" and provoked distrust among the authorities of his time, who opposed the creation of a Goethe monument on account of his offensive religious creed. August Wilhelm Schlegel considered Goethe "a heathen who converted to Islam."

Goethe showed interest in other religions, including Islam, although Karic suggests that attempts to claim Goethe for any religion "is a pointless, Sysiphean task". At age 23, Goethe wrote a poem about a river, originally part of a dramatic dialogue, which he published as a separate work called Mahomets Gesang ("Muhammad's Song").  The poem's depiction of nature and forces within it is consonant with his Sturm und Drang years.  In 1819, he published his West–östlicher Divan to ignite a poetic dialogue between East and West.  

Politically, Goethe described himself as a "moderate liberal". He was critical of the radicalism of Bentham and expressed sympathy for the prudent liberalism of François Guizot. At the time of the French Revolution, he thought the enthusiasm of the students and professors to be a perversion of their energy and remained skeptical of the ability of the masses to govern. Goethe sympathized with the American Revolution and later wrote a poem in which he declared "America, you're better off than our continent, the old." He did not join in the anti-Napoleonic mood of 1812, and he distrusted the strident nationalism which started to be expressed. The medievalism of the Heidelberg Romantics was also repellent to Goethe's eighteenth-century ideal of a supra-national culture.

Goethe was a Freemason, joining the lodge Amalia in Weimar in 1780, and frequently alluded to Masonic themes of universal brotherhood in his work. He was also attracted to the Bavarian Illuminati, a secret society founded on 1 May 1776. Although often requested to write poems arousing nationalist passions, Goethe would always decline. In old age, he explained why this was so to Eckermann:

Influence 

Goethe had a great effect on the nineteenth century. In many respects, he was the originator of many ideas which later became widespread. He produced volumes of poetry, essays, criticism, a theory of colours and early work on evolution and linguistics. He was fascinated by mineralogy, and the mineral goethite (iron oxide) is named after him. His non-fiction writings, most of which are philosophic and aphoristic in nature, spurred the development of many thinkers, including Georg Wilhelm Friedrich Hegel, Arthur Schopenhauer, Søren Kierkegaard, Friedrich Nietzsche, Ernst Cassirer, and Carl Jung. Along with Schiller, he was one of the leading figures of Weimar Classicism. Schopenhauer cited Goethe's novel Wilhelm Meister's Apprenticeship as one of the four greatest novels ever written, along with Tristram Shandy, La Nouvelle Héloïse and Don Quixote. Nietzsche wrote, "Four pairs it was that did not deny themselves to my sacrifice: Epicurus and Montaigne, Goethe and Spinoza, Plato and Rousseau, Pascal and Schopenhauer. With these I must come to terms when I have long wandered alone; they may call me right and wrong; to them will I listen when in the process they call each other right and wrong."

Goethe embodied many of the contending strands in art over the next century: his work could be lushly emotional, and rigorously formal, brief and epigrammatic, and epic. He would argue that Classicism was the means of controlling art, and that Romanticism was a sickness, even as he penned poetry rich in memorable images, and rewrote the formal rules of German poetry. His poetry was set to music by almost every major Austrian and German composer from Mozart to Mahler, and his influence would spread to French drama and opera as well. Beethoven declared that a "Faust" Symphony would be the greatest thing for art. Liszt and Mahler both created symphonies in whole or in large part inspired by this seminal work, which would give the 19th century one of its most paradigmatic figures: Doctor Faustus.

 
The Faust tragedy/drama, often called  (the drama of the Germans), written in two parts published decades apart, would stand as his most characteristic and famous artistic creation. Followers of the twentieth-century esotericist Rudolf Steiner built a theatre named the Goetheanum after him—where festival performances of Faust are still performed.

Goethe was also a cultural force. During his first meeting with Napoleon in 1808, the latter famously remarked: " (You are a man)!" The two discussed politics, the writings of Voltaire, and Goethe's Sorrows of Young Werther, which Napoleon had read seven times and ranked among his favorites. Goethe came away from the meeting deeply impressed with Napoleon's enlightened intellect and his efforts to build an alternative to the corrupt old regime. Goethe always spoke of Napoleon with the greatest respect, confessing that "nothing higher and more pleasing could have happened to me in all my life" than to have met Napoleon in person.

Germaine de Staël, in De l'Allemagne (1813), presented German Classicism and Romanticism as a potential source of spiritual authority for Europe, and identified Goethe as a living classic. She praised Goethe as possessing "the chief characteristics of the German genius" and uniting "all that distinguishes the German mind." Staël's portrayal helped elevate Goethe over his more famous German contemporaries and transformed him into a European cultural hero. Goethe met with her and her partner Benjamin Constant, with whom he shared a mutual admiration.

In Victorian England, Goethe's great disciple was Thomas Carlyle, who wrote the essays "Faustus" (1822), "Goethe's Helena" (1828), "Goethe" (1828), "Goethe's Works" (1832), "Goethe's Portrait" (1832), and "Death of Goethe" (1832) which introduced Goethe to English readers; translated Wilhelm Meister's Apprenticeship (1824) and Travels (1826), "Faust's Curse" (1830), "The Tale" (1832), "Novelle" (1832) and "Symbolum" at a time when few read German; and with whom Goethe corresponded. Goethe exerted a profound influence on George Eliot, whose partner George Henry Lewes wrote a Life of Goethe (dedicated to Carlyle). Eliot presented Goethe as "eminently the man who helps us to rise to a lofty point of observation" and praised his "large tolerance", which "quietly follows the stream of fact and of life" without passing moral judgments. Matthew Arnold found in Goethe the "Physician of the Iron Age" and "the clearest, the largest, the most helpful thinker of modern times" with a "large, liberal view of life".

It was to a considerable degree due to Goethe's reputation that the city of Weimar was chosen in 1919 as the venue for the national assembly, convened to draft a new constitution for what would become known as Germany's Weimar Republic. Goethe became a key reference for Thomas Mann in his speeches and essays defending the republic. He emphasized Goethe's "cultural and self-developing individualism", humanism, and cosmopolitanism.

The Federal Republic of Germany's cultural institution, the Goethe-Institut, is named after him, and promotes the study of German abroad and fosters knowledge about Germany by providing information on its culture, society and politics.

The literary estate of Goethe in the Goethe and Schiller Archives was inscribed on UNESCO's Memory of the World Register in 2001 in recognition of its historical significance.

Goethe's influence was dramatic because he understood that there was a transition in European sensibilities, an increasing focus on sense, the indescribable, and the emotional. This is not to say that he was emotionalistic or excessive; on the contrary, he lauded personal restraint and felt that excess was a disease: "There is nothing worse than imagination without taste". Goethe praised Francis Bacon for his advocacy of science based on experiment and his forceful revolution in thought as one of the greatest strides forward in modern science. However, he was critical of Bacon's inductive method and approach based on pure classification. He said in Scientific Studies:

Goethe's scientific and aesthetic ideas have much in common with Denis Diderot, whose work he translated and studied. Both Diderot and Goethe exhibited a repugnance towards the mathematical interpretation of nature; both perceived the universe as dynamic and in constant flux; both saw "art and science as compatible disciplines linked by common imaginative processes"; and both grasped "the unconscious impulses underlying mental creation in all forms." Goethe's Naturanschauer is in many ways a sequel to Diderot's interprète de la nature.

His views make him, along with Adam Smith, Thomas Jefferson, and Ludwig van Beethoven, a figure in two worlds: on the one hand, devoted to the sense of taste, order, and finely crafted detail, which is the hallmark of the artistic sense of the Age of Reason and the neo-classical period of architecture; on the other, seeking a personal, intuitive, and personalized form of expression and society, firmly supporting the idea of self-regulating and organic systems. George Henry Lewes celebrated Goethe's revolutionary understanding of the organism.

Thinkers such as Ralph Waldo Emerson would take up many similar ideas in the 1800s. Goethe's ideas on evolution would frame the question that Darwin and Wallace would approach within the scientific paradigm. The Serbian inventor and electrical engineer Nikola Tesla was heavily influenced by Goethe's Faust, his favorite poem, and had actually memorized the entire text. It was while reciting a certain verse that he was struck with the epiphany that would lead to the idea of the rotating magnetic field and ultimately, alternating current.

Books related to Goethe
 The Life of Goethe by George Henry Lewes
 Goethe: The History of a Man by Emil Ludwig
 Goethe by Georg Brandes. Authorized translation from the Danish (2nd ed. 1916) by Allen W. Porterfield, New York, Crown publishers, 1936. "Crown edition, 1936." Title Wolfgang Goethe
 Goethe: His Life and Times by 
 Lotte in Weimar: The Beloved Returns by Thomas Mann
 Conversations with Goethe by Johann Peter Eckermann
 Goethe's World: as seen in letters and memoirs ed. by Berthold Biermann
 Goethe: Four Studies by Albert Schweitzer
 Goethe Poet and Thinker by E.M. Wilkinson and L.A. Willoughby
 Goethe and his Publishers by 
 Goethe by T.J. Reed
 Goethe. A Psychoanalytic Study, by Kurt R. Eissler
 The Life of Goethe. A Critical Biography by John Williams
 Goethe: The Poet and the Age (2 Vols.), by Nicholas Boyle
 Goethe's Concept of the Daemonic: After the Ancients, by Angus Nicholls
 Goethe and Rousseau: Resonances of their Mind, by Carl Hammer, Jr.
 Doctor Faustus of the popular legend, Marlowe, the Puppet-Play, Goethe, and Lenau, treated historically and critically. – A parallel between Goethe and Schiller. – An historic outline of German Literature , by Louis Pagel
 Goethe and Schiller, Essays on German Literature, by Hjalmar Hjorth Boyesen
 Goethe-Wörterbuch (Goethe Dictionary, abbreviated GWb). Herausgegeben von der Berlin-Brandenburgischen Akademie der Wissenschaften, der Akademie der Wissenschaften in Göttingen und der Heidelberger Akademie der Wissenschaften. Stuttgart. Kohlhammer Verlag; 
West-Eastern Divan: Complete, annotated new translation, including Goethe's 'Notes and Essays' & the unpublished poems, translated by Eric Ormsby, 2019. Gingko, 
Goethe's Path to Creativity: A Psycho-Biography of the Eminent Politician, Scientist and Poet, translated by Deanna Stewart, New York, NY, Routledge, 2019.

See also
 Young Goethe in Love (2010)
 Dora Stock – her encounters with the 16-year-old Goethe.
 Goethe Basin, a large crater on the planet Mercury
 Johann-Wolfgang-von-Goethe-Gymnasium
 W. H. Murray – author of misattributed quotation "Until one is committed ..."
 "Nature", essay often mis-attributed to Goethe

Awards named after him
 Goethe Awards
 Goethe Prize
 Hanseatic Goethe Prize

Works
 Johann Wolfgang von Goethe bibliography

Notes

References

Citations

Sources

Further reading
Bell Matthew. 1994. Goethe's Naturalistic Anthropology : Man and Other Plants. Oxford: Clarendon Press.
 
 Calder, Angus (1983), Scott & Goethe: Romantiscism and Classicism, in Hearn, Sheila G. (ed.), Cencrastus No. 13, Summer 1983, pp. 25–28, 
Von Gronicka, André. 1968. The Russian Image of Goethe. Volume 1 Goethe in Russian Literature of the First Half of the Nineteenth Century. Philadelphia Pa: University of Pennsylvania Press.
Von Gronicka, Andrè. 1985 The Russian Image of Goethe. Volume 2 Goethe in Russian Literature of the Second Half of the Nineteenth Century. Philadelphia Pa: University of Pennsylvania Press.
Hatfield Henry Caraway. 1963. Goethe: A Critical Introduction. Cambridge, MA: Harvard University Press.
Jane K. n.d. Goethe's Allegories of Identity. Philadelphia Pa: University of Pennsylvania Press.
Maertz Gregory. 2017. Literature and the Cult of Personality: Essays on Goethe and His Influence. New York, NY:Columbia University Press. 
 
Robertson, Ritchie. 2016. Goethe : A Very Short Introduction. Oxford: Oxford University Press.

Viëtor Karl and Bayard Quincy Morgan. 1950. Goethe the Thinker. Cambridge Mass: Harvard University Press.

External links

 
 
 
 
 
 
 "Goethe and the Science of the Enlightenment" In Our Time, BBC Radio 4 discussion with Nicholas Boyle and Simon Schaffer (10 February 2000).
 
 At the Linda Hall Library, Goethe's:
 (1810) Zur Farbenlehre (Atlas)
 (1840) Goethe's Theory of Colours; translated from the German: with notes by Charles Lock Eastlake
 Works by and about Johann Wolfgang von Goethe in University Library JCS Frankfurt am Main: Digital Collections Judaica
 
 Goethe in English at Poems Found in Translation
 Poems of Goethe set to music, lieder.net
 Goethe Quotes: New English translations and German originals

 
1749 births
1832 deaths
18th-century educators
18th-century essayists
18th-century German civil servants
18th-century German dramatists and playwrights
18th-century German male writers
18th-century German novelists
18th-century German philosophers
18th-century German poets
18th-century historians
18th-century non-fiction writers
18th-century travel writers
19th-century educators
19th-century essayists
19th-century German civil servants
19th-century German diplomats
19th-century German dramatists and playwrights
19th-century German male writers
19th-century German non-fiction writers
19th-century German novelists
19th-century German philosophers
19th-century German poets
19th-century historians
19th-century travel writers
Color scientists
Enlightenment philosophers
Epic poets
Epigrammatists
Fabulists
Freethought writers
German autobiographers
German bibliophiles
German diplomats
German ethicists
German Freemasons
German historians
German librarians
German male dramatists and playwrights
German male non-fiction writers
German male novelists
German male poets
German philosophers
German travel writers
German untitled nobility
Leipzig University alumni
Literacy and society theorists
Literary theorists
Members of the Bavarian Academy of Sciences
Members of the Göttingen Academy of Sciences and Humanities
Natural philosophers
Pantheists
People from Weimar
Philosophers of art
Philosophers of culture
Philosophers of education
Philosophers of history
Philosophers of language
Philosophers of linguistics
Philosophers of literature
Philosophers of science
Philosophers of sexuality
Philosophers of social science
Philosophy writers
Political philosophers
Scientists from Weimar
Romantic poets
Social commentators
Social philosophers
Sturm und Drang
Theorists on Western civilization
University of Strasbourg alumni
Writers about activism and social change
Writers from Frankfurt
Writers from Weimar